"Son of the White Wolf" is an El Borak short story by American writer Robert E. Howard.  It was originally published in the December 1936 issue of the pulp magazine Thrilling Adventures.

References

External links
 List of stories and publication details at Howard Works

Short stories by Robert E. Howard
Pulp stories
1936 short stories
Works originally published in Thrilling Adventures
Short stories published posthumously